Songs from the Floodplain is Jon Boden's second solo album. The folk songs are set in a future, post-apocalyptic United Kingdom.

Track listing

Personnel 
Jon Boden (vocals, fiddle, guitars, concertina, double bass, drums, percussion, melodeon, harmonium)

References

Jon Boden albums
2009 albums